Orbie Lee "Orb" Bowling (born March 31, 1939)  is a 6'10" retired American basketball player.  A native of Sandy Hook, Kentucky he was also known as "Chief."

Bowling played collegiately for the University of Tennessee.

Bowling was selected by the New York Knicks in the 11th round (78th pick overall) of the 1963 NBA Draft.

Bowling played for the Washington Generals, including a game in front of the Queen of the United Kingdom.

Bowling played for the Kentucky Colonels (1967–68) in the American Basketball Association for 11 games.

References

External links

City of Hoops: YMCA regular has traveled world chasing a game

1939 births
Living people
American men's basketball players
Basketball players from Kentucky
Centers (basketball)
Kentucky Colonels players
New York Knicks draft picks
Tennessee Volunteers basketball players
Washington Generals players